Ivan Semyonov can refer to:

 Ivan Semyonov (athlete) (1924-1966), Soviet athlete
 Ivan Semyonov (equestrian) (born 1936), Soviet equestrian
 Ivan Semyonov (footballer) (born 1988), Russian footballer
Ivan Semyonov (artist), Russian graphic artist, People's Artist of the USSR